Orin is a hamlet and the locus of a same-named census-designated place (CDP) in Converse County, Wyoming, United States. The population was 46 at the 2010 census.

History
The community was named for Orin Hughitt, the uncle of a railroad official.  A post office was established at the Orin Junction in 1891. The name was changed to Orin in 1895, and the post office closed in about 1962. 

Orin was the final place outlaw Doc Middleton owned and operated a saloon, before dying in the local jail in 1913.

Geography
The community is located at the intersection of Interstate 25/U.S. Route 26/U.S. Route 87 and U.S. Route 18/U.S. Route 20. A BNSF Railway line runs through the community.

According to the United States Census Bureau, the CDP has a total area of 1.1 square miles (2.9 km), with 1.0 square mile (2.6 km) is land and 0.1 square mile (0.26 km) (9.1%) is water.

References

Census-designated places in Wyoming
Census-designated places in Converse County, Wyoming